Moments in a Lifetime is a biographical/autiobiographical book about the Irish band Clannad, written by Barbara Bennett with band member Noel Duggan. The book was published to coincide with Clannad's 2008 tour of Britain and Ireland. The book contains exclusive photographs and accounts of touring and recording as a band.

Synopsis

References 

Clannad
2008 non-fiction books
Biographies about musicians
Music autobiographies